The 2023 NCAA Division I FCS football season, part of college football in the United States, is organized by the National Collegiate Athletic Association (NCAA) at the Division I Football Championship Subdivision (FCS) level. The regular season will begin in August and will end in November. The postseason will begin in November, and, aside from any all-star games that are scheduled, will end on January 6th, 2024, with the 2024 NCAA Division I Football Championship Game at Toyota Stadium in Frisco, Texas.

Conference changes and new programs

Membership changes for 2023

In addition to the listed membership changes, on February 22, 2022, the Big South Conference and Ohio Valley Conference announced that they would merge their football leagues effective in 2023. Certain key details of the merger—specifically, whether the merged league would be run by the Big South or OVC, or become a separate entity—have yet to be announced.

On December 20, 2022, the ASUN Conference and Western Athletic Conference, which had entered into a football-only partnership in 2021, announced that they would fully merge their football leagues effective in 2023. The new conference, tentatively known as the ASUN–WAC Football Conference, will feature ASUN members Austin Peay, Central Arkansas, Eastern Kentucky, and North Alabama, plus WAC members Abilene Christian, Southern Utah, Stephen F. Austin, Tarleton, and Utah Tech. The new football conference will play a six-game conference schedule in 2023 before starting round-robin play in 2024.

Rule changes

Other headlines

Kickoff games

"Week Zero"
The regular season will begin on Saturday, August 26 in Week 0.

 FCS Kickoff (Cramton Bowl, Montgomery, Alabama): Mercer, North Alabama
 MEAC/SWAC Challenge (Center Parc Stadium, Atlanta): South Carolina State, Jackson State

FCS team wins over FBS teams

Non-DI team wins over FCS teams

Upsets
This section lists instances of unranked teams defeating ranked teams during the season.

Regular season

Regular season top 10 matchups
Rankings reflect the STATS Poll.

Rankings

The top 25 from the STATS and USA Today Coaches Polls.

Pre-season polls

Conference standings

Conference summaries

Postseason

Coaching changes

Preseason and in-season
This is restricted to coaching changes that took place on or after May 1, 2023, and will include any changes announced after a team's last regularly scheduled games but before its playoff games. For coaching changes that occurred earlier in 2023, see 2022 NCAA Division I FCS end-of-season coaching changes.

End of season
This list includes coaching changes announced during the season that did not take effect until the end of the season.

See also
 2023 NCAA Division I FBS football season
 2023 NCAA Division II football season
 2023 NCAA Division III football season
 2023 NAIA football season

References